Alex Aufdenblatten is a former Swiss curler. He played  second position on the Swiss rink that won .

Teams

Private life
He is owner of "Walliserkanne", a restaurant in Zermatt, that his family created in 1930s.

References

External links
 
Alex Aufdenblatten, Zermatt - Contact - Easymonitoring

Living people

Swiss male curlers
European curling champions
Swiss curling champions
Restaurateurs
Swiss businesspeople
Year of birth missing (living people)